The Coccidae are a family of scale insects belonging to the superfamily Coccoidea. They are commonly known as soft scales, wax scales or tortoise scales. The females are flat with elongated oval bodies and a smooth integument which may be covered with wax. In some genera they possess legs but in others, they do not, and the antennae may be shortened or missing. The males may be winged or wingless.

Genera
There are >1,100 spp. in 171 genera worldwide.
Subfamily Myzolecaniinae
 Akermes
 Alecanium
 Alecanopsis
 Cribolecanium
 Cryptostigma
 Cyclolecanium
 Halococcus
 Houardia
 Megasaissetia
 Myzolecanium
 Neolecanium
 Paractenochiton
 Pseudophilippia
 Richardiella
 Torarchus
 Toumeyella
 Xenolecanium
 Antecerococcus
 Ceroplastes
 Coccus Linnaeus, 1758
 Eucalymnatus Cockerell, 1901
 Eulecanium
 Kilifia De Lotto, 1965
 Lecanium
Luzulaspis Targioni Tozzetti, 1868
 Metaceronema
 Milviscutulus
 Paralecanium Cockerell in Cockerell & Parrott 1899
 Parasaissetia Takahashi 1955
 Parthenolecanium Šulc 1908

 Physokermes Targioni Tozzetti 1868
 Protopulvinaria Cockerell 1894
 Pulvinaria Targioni-tozzetti, 1867
 Saissetia Deplanche, 1858

See also
 Coccus viridis
 Eulecanium cerasorum
 Maacoccus arundinariae
 Pulvinaria innumerabilis

References

External links
 Images at BugGuide
Florida wax scale on the UF / IFAS Featured Creatures Web site

 
Hemiptera families